The RijnWaalpad is a bicycle highway in Gelderland. The 15.8km long cycle path connects Arnhem, located on the Nederrijn, and Nijmegen on the Waal. The bike freeway was opened on July 3, 2015, making it the first bike freeway in the region. 

It is an independent bike freeway where cyclists do not have to wait at traffic lights. New infrastructure has been built for the RijnWaalpad, such as a bicycle tunnel under the A15 motorway, a bicycle bridge at Lent and another tunnel at Bemmel. The total construction costs amounted to €17 million.

External links
 RijnWaalpad

Cycleways in the Netherlands
Bicycle highways
Transport in Gelderland
Arnhem
Nijmegen